The sixth season of the French/Canadian drama/adventure television series Highlander began airing 5 October 1997 and finished on 16 May 1998. It was the final season of the program. The series follows the adventures of Duncan MacLeod, a 400-year-old Immortal who can only die if he is beheaded. The ongoing battle between Immortals is known as the Game.

Production
Although season five was meant to be the final season of the show, the show was renewed for a sixth season. Production began in July and ended in December. When funding finally was announced, Adrian Paul was working on Highlander: Endgame and said he’d only be available for half the season or eleven episodes. Peter Wingfield, Jim Byrnes, and Elizabeth Gracen were contracted to fill out the season. However, Wingfield and Gracen had other commitments that prevented them from being available for filming until November 1997. The series began filming in Paris in the summer and the producers had been approached about doing a spin-off series, which would center on a female immortal (which later became Highlander: The Raven). A number of "spec" scripts for the new series were filmed as episodes to fill out the season, but funding was again cut and only thirteen episodes were filmed. Duncan does not appear in two episodes, "Two of Hearts" (which doesn't feature any of the main cast) and "Indiscretions", which was the last episode filmed for the series, but was shown before the finale two-parter, "To Be" and "Not To Be".

Cast

Main cast
 Adrian Paul ... Duncan MacLeod
 Elizabeth Gracen ... Amanda
 Peter Wingfield ... Methos
 Jim Byrnes ... Joe Dawson

Supporting cast

 Michel Albertini ... Raphael Vega 
 Boris Anderssen ... Mr. Faith  
 Paul Bandey ... Swinson  
 Terence Beesley ... Jackie Beaufort 
 Diane Bellego ... Elena Moreno  
 Andrew Bicknell ... Devon Marek
 Ed Bishop ... Edward Banner
 Benedick Blythe ... Morgan Walker
 Robert Bradford ... Hospital Guard 
 Jasper Britton ... Willie Kingsley
 Lisa Butler ... Jillian O'Hara 
 Bernard Chabin ... Jose 
 Norman Chaucer ... Caruso
 Claudia Christian ... Katherine 
 Nicholas Clay ... Loxley 
 Dean Cook ... Young Max     
 Rowena Cooper ... Berta Symes   
 Alain Creff ... Benoit 
 Luke D'Silva & Julius D'Silva ... The Brothers Montoya
 Roger Daltrey ... Hugh Fitzcairn / 3 episodes
 Alexis Denisof ... Steve Banner
 Anita Dobson ... Molly Ivers  
 Sam Douglas ... Baxter
 Danny Dyer ... Andrew  
 Jack Ellis ... Bartholomew 
 Christian Erickson ... Jack Kendall 
 Alice Evans ... Kyra 
 Rita Ghosn ... Mia Baptista  
 Christophe Guybert ... Pierre
 Michael Halsey ... Milos Vladic  
 Adam Henderson ... Shemp
 Sandra Hess ... Reagan Cole  
 David Hill ... Rowan Mitchell   
 David Hoskin ... Andres Seguy 
 Peter Hudson ... James Horton / 4 episodes
 Godfrey James ... Frederick of Godfrey
 Paris Jefferson ... Toni 
 Gunilla Karlzen ... Celine
 Alexi Kaye-Campbell ... Dice 
 Claire Keim ... Marie  
 Stan Kirsch ... Richie Ryan 
 Theirry Langerak ... Allan    
 Steve Lyon ... Zep   
 Emile Ambossolo M'bo ... Jocko 
 Martin McDougall ... Liam O'Rourke / 2 episodes
 Kathleen McGoldrick ... Tara
 Bogdan Marian-Stanoevitch ... Sears  
 Steven O'Shea ... Nick Sutherland 
 Stéphanie Petit ... Lazlo
 Valentine Pelka ... Kronos / 2 episodes
 Olivier Picasso ... Checco  
 Brian Protheroe ... Bannock 
 Matthew Radford Davies ... William of Godfrey 
 Tobias Raineri ... Ramon Castille
 Patrick Rameau ... Bertrand 
 Kenan Raven ... Stein 
 Rochelle Redfield ... Margo   
 Malcolm Rennie ... Drimble
 Malcolm Rennie ... Smythe 
 Ian Richardson ... Max Leiner 
 Cleo Rocos ... Juliette   
 Grant Russell ... Armando Baptista 
 David Saracino ... Beck
 John Scarborough ... George Thomas
 Joe Searby ... Gerald LeBlanc 
 Rachel Shelley ... Sophie Baines   
 Hugh Simon ... Percy Tynebridge 
 Jay Simon ... Cameron
 Donald Standen ... Richard Albright 
 Deborah Steele ... Marisa  
 Dudley Sutton ... Father Robert
 Aaron Swartz ... David Leiner 
 Louise Taylor ... Amy   
 Dara Tomanovich ... Alex Raven
 Jean-Yves Thual ... Ahriman 
 Paula Jane Ulrich ... Young Molly Ivers  
 Justina Vail ... Katya
 Alexandra Vandernoot ... Tessa Noël / 2 episodes
 Olivier Vitran ... Tom / 2 episodes
 Paulette Williams ... Charlotte
 Alexandre Zambeau ... Terry

Episodes

Home media

References

External links
 Highlander: The Series episode list at Epguides
 Highlander: The Series episode list at the Internet Movie Database

6
1997 French television seasons
1998 French television seasons
1997 Canadian television seasons
1998 Canadian television seasons